The 1920 FA Cup final, the first since the end of the First World War, was contested by Aston Villa and Huddersfield at Stamford Bridge. Aston Villa won 1–0, with the goal coming in extra time from Billy Kirton, to clinch the trophy for a record sixth time. This was the first ever FA Cup Final to require extra time to be played.

This was Aston Villa's sixth FA Cup Final win. Their opponents had secured promotion from the Second Division this season, having nearly gone out of business, and were appearing in their first final. Aston Villa captain, Andy Ducat, had represented England at both football and cricket. The Villa team had four surviving members of the club's last F.A. Cup final victory in 1913; Tommy Weston, Sam Hardy, Clem Stephenson and Charlie Wallace. Those four Villa players and Frank Moss had all served in the Armed Forces during World War I. Frank Barson, known for his tough style of play, was warned before the kick-off by the referee against using his normal tactics.

This was Villa manager George Ramsay's sixth FA Cup Final win, a record for a manager, and one that was only equalled in 2015 by Arsène Wenger – against Aston Villa. The trophy was presented by Prince Henry, the fourth son of King George V.

Road to the Final
How the finalists reached the final. Huddersfield Town were in the Second Division at this time.

Aston Villa

Huddersfield Town

Match details

References

External links
 FA Cup Final lineups

FA Cup Finals
FA Cup Final 1920
FA Cup Final 1920
FA Cup
FA Cup
FA Cup